The King's Royal Regiment of New York, also known as Johnson's Royal Regiment of New York, King's Royal Regiment, King's Royal Yorkers, and Royal Greens, were one of the first Loyalist regiments, raised on June 19, 1776, in British Canada, during the American Revolutionary War.

The King's Royal Regiment of New York was formed by exiled Loyalist leader, Sir John Johnson, from American refugees, fleeing rebel persecution, the regiment served with distinction throughout the war, launching raids and relief missions into the Mohawk Valley of New York.

The regiment was instrumental in the siege of Fort Stanwix, during the expedition of Colonel Barry St. Leger, down the Mohawk River Valley, in the summer of 1777, and saw action, that same year, in the Saratoga Campaign, at the Battle of Oriskany, Carleton' s Raid, in 1778, and the devastating raid on the Schoharie Valley, in 1780. Along with American Indian allies and fellow provincial regiments, such as Butler's Rangers, the regiment fought a series of low-level raiding campaigns, through the Mohawk Valley.  This region was a major agricultural area of New York, and these raids were intended to interdict the supply of foodstuffs to General George Washington's army while pressuring the Revolution's political leaders in the region, who were actively persecuting Loyalist residents as traitors aiding and supplying British troops.

The regiment eventually comprised two battalions.  Following the war, the first battalion was disbanded in 1783 and the second battalion in 1784. Members of the regiment relocated to the British province of Quebec. They were granted land along the St. Lawrence River valley and Bay of Quinte, today within the province of Ontario in Canada.

Raising the regiment: 1776 
On 19 May 1776, Sir John Johnson left his home at Johnson Hall in the Mohawk Valley and travelled with his family and approximately 200 retainers through the Adirondack Mountains to Montreal, Quebec.  They arrived on 15 June, just days after Governor Sir Guy Carleton's army recaptured the city.  Johnson soon left Montreal to chase the retreating Continental Army southwards down the Richelieu Valley towards Lake Champlain.  He met Carleton at Fort Chambly, where the Governor authorized Johnson to raise the King's Royal Regiment of New York.

Initially, the members of the regiment comprised Johnson's refugee retainers from his estates in the Mohawk Valley, but the steady stream of Loyalist refugees fleeing to Montreal provided a ready source of recruits for the King's Royal Yorkers.

St. Leger Expedition: 1777 
Part of the British Army's strategy to defeat the Continental forces under General Washington involved invading New York from Canada along the traditional Lake Champlain and Lake George water route.  A main army from Canada, under the command of Sir John Burgoyne, advanced southwards along this route towards Albany.  A second army, under the command of Colonel Barry St. Leger, advanced from Carleton Island in the Saint Lawrence River to Oswego with the intention of descending the Mohawk River valley.  St. Leger's army included a small force of regular British soldiers, a large American Indian contingent comprising Six Nations and Canadian Indian warriors, a contingent of Hessian soldiers, volunteers under Joseph Brant's command, and the King's Royal Yorkers under Johnson's command.

St. Leger's army besieged Fort Stanwix (located in modern Rome, New York), which was defended by a sizable contingent of Continental Army troops.  During the siege, a relief column of 800 men under the command of General Nicholas Herkimer and comprising New York militia advanced towards Fort Stanwix.  On 6 August 1777, this relief force was ambushed by American Indian and King's Royal Yorkers at the Battle of Oriskany.  During the battle, the relief column was decimated and suffered over 400 casualties, including Herkimer himself, who eventually died of wounds.  Routed, the surviving American militia retreated from Oriskany.

During the Oriskany engagement, the garrison of Fort Stanwix attacked the encampment of the Crown forces.  Johnson and his family were nearly captured, and large quantities of material were seized.  Having suffered heavy casualties during the battle, St. Leger's American Indian allies were demoralized by the loss of their camp.  The Crown and Indian forces retreated back towards Lake Ontario when reports of another relief force under the command of Benedict Arnold was received.

Campaigns Into the New York valleys: 1778–1782 
For the remainder of the Revolution, the King's Royal Yorkers formed an integral part of Canada's garrison.  However, each year the regiment sent parties on raids into the Mohawk and neighbouring valleys for the purposes of rescuing beleaguered Loyalists and interfering with the ability of the Continental Army forces to use the region's crops as a source of food for Washington's army.  These raids were generally launched from the Lake Champlain corridor or from Oswego, and caused a great deal of disruption.  The militia of Northern New York never recovered from the disaster at Oriskany, and the region stood relatively defenseless.

In 1780, a large raid in to the Schoharie Valley led by Sir John Johnson gave rise to the destruction of large numbers of farms and pitched battles between the raiders and the demoralized American militia.  (Battle of Klock's Field)

Postwar 
New York City remained in British hands until the end of the war, behind the protection of its large garrison and the Royal Navy.  However, the inability of British commanders to defeat the Revolution led the war to drag on for eight years, resulting in the Contintenal and French armies' capture of two major British field armies (Battle of Saratoga, Battle of Yorktown) and eroding the British political will to attempt a military solution.  As a result, the government of Lord North collapsed and the new British government was formed from parliamentary advocates of a negotiated peace.

The Treaty of Paris of 1783 ended the war but left little opportunity for Loyalists to return to their former homes.  Municipal and state government in the new United States were held by supporters of Congress.  Few of the former rebels were prepared to forget, no less forgive, the punishing raids by the Loyalist regiments in Canada.  Still other Congressional sympathizers had enjoyed profit by selling land, homes and farms seized from Loyalists.  Under the Treaty, the Loyalists were to be compensated for their losses by the State governments under the arbitration of the United States government.  This compensation was never paid. Instead, the British government offered land grants in Canada to the refugees who had fled their homes during the War and those who left afterwards.

In 1783, the 1st Battalion of the King's Royal Yorkers was disbanded and settled along the St. Lawrence Valley in the vicinity of Cornwall in modern Stormont and Dundas counties.  The following year, the 2nd Battalion was disbanded and settled in modern Frontenac and Lennox and Addington counties.

Sir John Johnson settled in Montreal and also held farms in Williamstown, Ontario and the seigneuries of Monnoir and Argenteuil in Quebec. He was buried in a family vault at Mont Saint-Gregoire, Quebec.

Other officers of the regiment have known graves. Jeremiah French, a lieutenant in the second battalion, was buried at the Maple Grove Cemetery, west of Cornwall, Ontario.  In 2004, a new gravestone was dedicated for French in the presence of several of his descendants and members of the recreated King's Royal Yorkers.

Legacy 
In 1975, a living history regiment reenacting the King's Royal Yorkers was raised in Ontario.  The reenactment King's Royal Yorkers are the largest and most active living history unit in Canada.

References

 Cruikshank, Ernest A. and Watt, Gavin K., The History and Master Roll of the King's Royal Regiment of New York, Revised Edition, Toronto: 1984 (New Edition: 2006)  
 Gavin K. Watt and James F. Morrison, The British Campaign of 1777, Volume One, The St. Leger Expedition. The Forces of the Crown and Congress, Second Edition, (Second Edition, Expanded and Updated, 2005),  
 Freyer, Mary Beacock, King's Men: the Soldier Founders of Ontario, Toronto: Dundurn, 1980
 Watt, Gavin K., The Burning of the Valleys:  Daring Raids From Canada Against the New York Frontier in the Fall of 1780, Toronto: Dundurn, 1997. 
 Watt, Gavin K., Rebellion in the Mohawk Valley: The St. Leger Expedition of 1777, Toronto: Dundurn, 2002

External links 
 The King's Royal Yorkers, recreated unit
 Index to King's Royal Regiment of New York History

Loyalist military units in the American Revolution
Province of Quebec (1763–1791)
Military units and formations disestablished in 1784